Foothill Boulevard is a major road in the city and county of Los Angeles, as well as an arterial road in the city and county of San Bernardino, stretching well over  in length, with some notable breaks along the route.  Like its name implies, Foothill Boulevard runs across the foothills of the San Gabriel and San Bernardino Mountains.

For much of its length, Foothill Boulevard is the historic Route 66, so many diners and other establishments along the road have been refurbished in a 1950s style, or otherwise trade on the Route 66 association.

Route description

 Foothill Boulevard starts off in Newhall Pass in the Sylmar district of Los Angeles at Sierra Highway near the southern terminus of the Antelope Valley Freeway (SR 14). Foothill Boulevard is a two-lane road through Newhall Pass, paralleling the Interstate 5 truck lanes until its intersection with Balboa Boulevard, where it becomes a four-lane road for the remainder of its length. At the I-5/I-210 interchange, Foothill Boulevard heads southeast along the Foothill Freeway, bypassing the city of San Fernando, entering Lake View Terrace south of the I-210/SR 118 interchange. SR 118 formerly ran along Foothill Boulevard from the 210/118 interchange until Pasadena.  In 1974, the current alignment of Interstate 210 was completed, and the only remaining portion of the Foothill Boulevard Freeway was the unsigned freeway over the Arroyo Seco in Pasadena.

Foothill Boulevard leaves the San Fernando Valley, passing through the Sunland and Tujunga neighborhoods in the northwestern Crescenta Valley. It then enters the Crescenta Highlands neighborhood of Glendale and serves as a main street in the north Glendale area. Then it enters the unincorporated area of La Crescenta-Montrose (known just as "La Crescenta" to locals), and it serves as the main street through the valley.  Upon crossing the Verdugo Wash, it enters the city of La Cañada Flintridge and the northern terminus of the Glendale Freeway. Further east is the southern terminus of the Angeles Crest Highway (SR 2).  Note that although the Glendale Freeway and Angeles Crest Highway both end at Foothill Boulevard, Foothill itself does not intersect State Route 2, as SR 2's alignment heads east  on Interstate 210.  This portion of Foothill Boulevard is operated by Glendale Transit line 3 and Metro Local lines 90 and 690. The western segment of Foothill Boulevard ends at Oak Grove Drive in Pasadena, where it heads southeast across the unsigned freeway alignment, with an interchange at Yucca Lane. To reach the second portion of Foothill Boulevard, one must head east on Oak Grove, where it becomes Woodbury Road, head south on Fair Oaks Avenue, and head east on Walnut Street, passing through Old Town Pasadena, where at Greenwood Avenue, Foothill Boulevard branches off.

Until the 1960s, there was another segment of Foothill Boulevard that extended north into Altadena along the current route of Altadena Drive. This spur began at the current intersection of Foothill Boulevard and Altadena Drive in the eastern part of Pasadena—at that time, Foothill was named East Foothill Boulevard; Altadena Drive north of Foothill was signed North Foothill Boulevard, while Altadena Drive south of Foothill was signed Santa Anita Avenue. At Mendocino Lane in Altadena, the route became East Foothill Boulevard again and ran east–west through the central part of Altadena. It is not clear if the two segments were ever supposed to be connected, as the Arroyo Seco and Jet Propulsion Laboratory intervene; however, the changes in direction and duplicate street names were confusing—not only did North Foothill meet East Foothill, there were two East Foothill Boulevards (one in Pasadena and one in Altadena) and two Santa Anita Avenues (again, one in Pasadena and one in Altadena.) The city of Pasadena and the County of Los Angeles both agreed to change the name of the spur north of Foothill to Altadena Drive; Santa Anita Avenue between Foothill and the southern city limit of Pasadena was also renamed Altadena Drive, though that name change did not occur until the early 1970s.

   Foothill Boulevard remains parallel to Interstate 210 until entering the Arcadia city limits, where it heads due east and the freeway heads southeast. This section of Foothill Boulevard, which ends at Mountain Avenue in Monrovia, was also a part of US 66 until the late 1930s.  Before Huntington Drive was built through Duarte, Foothill Boulevard ran along the current routing of Royal Oaks Drive between Shamrock Avenue in Monrovia just past Highland Avenue in Duarte, meeting the current end of Foothill Boulevard at the San Gabriel River bridge. Most of the old route in eastern Duarte was removed during the housing boom in the 1940s.
The third section of Foothill Boulevard is accessed by going south on Mountain and going east on Huntington Drive through the Los Angeles County cities of Monrovia and Duarte.  Upon crossing the San Gabriel River into Irwindale, Huntington turns into Foothill Boulevard. Foothill passes through the city of Azusa, where it jogs north at Citrus Avenue. It continues through Glendora one block north of the old U.S. Route 66 to Amelia Avenue. In Azusa, east of Cerritos Avenue, Alosta Avenue (the old U.S. Route 66) forks southeast (the city of Glendora renamed Alosta Avenue "Route 66"), and at Amelia Avenue, it turns back into Foothill Boulevard. At the interchange with SR 210 near the San Dimas/La Verne city limits, Foothill Boulevard is defined as State Route 66, although it is unsigned in Los Angeles County. Foothill Blvd (SR 66) passes through the north end of Pomona and Claremont before entering San Bernardino County in the city of Upland. Foothill passes through residential areas before emerging in Rancho Cucamonga, where it intersects Interstate 15.  Foothill Boulevard continues east through the cities of Fontana (and such landmarks as Bono's Restaurant and Deli), Rialto, and San Bernardino. Foothill Boulevard ends at the San Bernardino city limits, where it retains its SR 66 signage, but changes into 5th Street and the route passes through downtown San Bernardino. At the interchange with Interstate 215, the SR 66 designation ends (at downtown San Bernardino), although old US 66 headed north on Mount Vernon Avenue (along old US 395/US 91) before exiting the Inland Empire over the Cajon Pass. Fifth Street has an interchange with SR 210 in Highland before turning into Greenspot Road, where it ends in the San Bernardino Mountains.

There are US 66 signs within the cities of Rancho Cucamonga, Rialto, and San Bernardino.  Many other cities along the boulevard have posted "Historic Route 66" signage.

California's legislature has relinquished state control of the segment from the Pomona–Claremont line east to the Fontana–Rialto line, and turned it over to local control.

SR 66 is part of the California Freeway and Expressway System, although it is neither a freeway nor an expressway. SR 66 is part of the National Highway System, a network of highways that are considered essential to the country's economy, defense, and mobility by the Federal Highway Administration.

See also

Foothill Boulevard Milestone (Mile 11)
 Interstate 210
 U.S. Route 66

References

External links

Streets in Los Angeles County, California
Streets in San Bernardino County, California
Streets in Los Angeles
Streets in Pasadena, California
Streets in the San Fernando Valley
Streets in the San Gabriel Valley
Boulevards in the United States
Crescenta Valley
Pomona Valley
La Cañada Flintridge, California
Lake View Terrace, Los Angeles
Sun Valley, Los Angeles
Sunland-Tujunga, Los Angeles
U.S. Route 66 in California